Johan Ludvig Johannesen (6 August 1879 – 25 May 1953) was a Norwegian politician.

He was born in Borge to Johannes Jensen and Beate Larsen. 
He was elected representative to the Storting for the periods 1934–1936 and 1937–1945, for the Labour Party. He was a member of the municipal council of Fredrikstad from 1910 to 1919, and from  1925 to 1933.

References

1879 births
1953 deaths
People from Fredrikstad
Østfold politicians
Labour Party (Norway) politicians
Members of the Storting